The Bhale Sultan Khanzada are a Muslim community found in the state of Uttar Pradesh in India. Specificaly in the sultanpur and neighbouring area. They are also known as khan and They are a sub-group with in the ethnic pathan community of eastern Uttar Pradesh.

Origin 
The Bhale Sultan Khanzadas are different clans have different traditions regarding their conversions. According to some authorities, the  word Bhale Sultan means king of Spear, a title given to army commanders in medieval India. Spear is called Bhala in Indian languages. There are in fact two  distinct communities of Bhale Sultan, those of Bulandshahr and those of Awadh.

In western Uttar Pradesh, the Bhale Sultan of Bulandshahr District trace to ancestry to Hamir Singh, a Solanki Rajput, who was granted the title of  Bhale Sultan by a grateful Sultan of Delhi for subjugating the Meos,  who had been attacking royal forces. He was granted a jagir near Delhi, and settled in the village of Amigan. A descendant of Hamir Singh, Khan Chand converted to Islam, and was granted an estate in Khurja. Khan Chand was an important courtier of Khizar Khan Sayyid. They are now several Bhale Sultan villages in the vicinity of Khurja.  They form one of the larger Ranghar biradaris in the district.

The Bhale Sultan in Awadh have different traditions as to their origin. Those in Sultanpur District  trace their descent from Palhan Deo. This conversion is said to have taken at the time of Sher Shah Suri. From Palhan Deo descend the taluqdar families of Deogaon, Unchgaon and Mahona. While in neighbouring Faizabad District, they trace their descent to Rao Mardan Sinh, a horse dealer from the village of Dundiya Khera, who is said to have to seized territory from the Bhars, which was confirmed by the then Sultan of Delhi. A descendant Baram Deo converted to Islam, and founded the Faizabad branch of the community.

Besides these taluqdar families, there are several settlements of the Bhale Sultan Khanzada found throughout Awadh. In Barabanki District, they are found in several villages near the town of Subeha. While in Sultanpur District, there are several settlements near Jagdishpur, such Makhdumpur, Kachhnaon, and Nasura. Other settlements are found in Gonda, Bahraich, Balrampur, Shravasti, Kheri and Raebareli districts.

Present circumstances
They are Sunni Muslims, but incorporate many folk beliefs. In eastern Uttar Pradesh, the Bhale Sultan speak both Awadhi and Urdu., while those of Bulandshahr District largely speak Urdu. Those who belonged to the taluqdar families and at one time were substantial landowners, but with the carrying out of land reform by the government of India after independence in 1947, they lost many of their larger estates. The community is now mainly made up of small to medium-sized farmers, growing wheat, sorghum, pulses and sugar cane. They have no caste council or panchayat, although there are localised panchayats in their villages. The Bhale Sultan intermarry into neighbouring Khanzada communities, while in western Uttar Pradesh, the Bhale Sultan intermarry with other neighbouring Ashraf communities.

References

Khanzada
Muslim communities of Uttar Pradesh
Muslim communities of India